Nils Ferlin (11 December 1898 - 21 October 1961) was a Swedish poet and lyricist.

Biography

Nils Ferlin was born in  Karlstad, Värmland, where his father worked at Nya Wermlands-Tidningen. In 1908, the family moved to Filipstad, and his father started his own newspaper. His father died the next year, however, and the family moved from their comfortable residence to a humbler dwelling in the industrial district so that Ferlin could finish his education. He graduated at the age of sixteen.

Ferlin had a minor career as an actor and debuted at the age of seventeen in Salomé by Oscar Wilde. He continued his career with a traveling theater company.

Although many of Ferlin's poems are melancholic, they are not without humor. Several were set to music and became popular songs such as En valsmelodi, an attack on the music industry. Ferlin sold over 300,000 volumes of his poetry during his lifetime. His lasting appeal is partly attributed to his vivid portrayal of central Stockholm before urban renewal and his association with the popular culture that flourished there then.

Several statues of Nils Ferlin have been erected in Sweden: one in Filipstad of him sitting on a park bench, one in the Karlstad city square of him standing on a table, and one near Klara kyrka in Stockholm of him lighting a cigarette.

Ferlin’s lyrics have been translated into English by Martin S. Allwood, Fred Lane, Thord Fredenholm  and Roger Hinchliffe.

Bibliography
1930 En döddansares visor (Songs of a death dancer)
1933 Barfotabarn (Barefoot children)
1937 Lars och Lisa i Stockholm (Lars and Lisa in Stockholm)
1938 Goggles 
1944 Med många kulörta lyktor (With plenty of colored lanterns)
1951 Kejsarens papegoja (The emperor's parrot)
1957 Från mitt ekorrhjul (From my squirrel wheel)

See also
Swedish ballad tradition

References

External links

Swedish
Nils Ferlin sällskapet
Nils Ferlin at Swedish music and film.
Cirkusartisten som blev vår folkkäraste poet
English
.
Nils Ferlin at the Internet Archive.
Translations
Couplet and other poems
Videos

 Song begins at 8:36 of medley. 
 Song begins at 7:42 of medley.

1898 births
1961 deaths
People from Karlstad
Writers from Värmland
Swedish-language poets
20th-century poets